Daniel Beer (born 1973) is Reader in Modern European history at Royal Holloway, University of London. His book, The House of the Dead, won the 2017 Cundill History Prize and was shortlisted for the Wolfson History Prize.

Selected publications
 Renovating Russia: The Human Sciences and the Fate of Liberal Modernity, 1880–1930. Cornell University Press, 2008. 
 The House of the Dead: Siberian Exile Under the Tsars. Allen Lane, 2016.

References

External links

1967 births
Academics of Royal Holloway, University of London
Living people
Historians of Russia